Latvian law is a part of a legal system of Latvia. It is largely civil, as opposed to a common, law system, based on epitomes in the German and French systems. The Latvian legal system is grounded on the principles laid out in the Constitution of the Republic of Latvia and safeguarded by the Constitutional Court of the Republic of Latvia.

History
During the Soviet time the adapted law of the USSR was in force in Latvia. 

The European Union law is an integral part of the  Latvian legal system since 1 May 2004.

Human rights in Latvia

Capital punishment in Latvia

See also 
Declaration On the Restoration of Independence of the Republic of Latvia
 Legal systems of the world